Thirlaway is a surname. Notable people with the surname include:

 Billy Thirlaway (1896–1983), English footballer
 Hal Thirlaway (1917–2009), British seismologist 
 Simon Thirlaway, British cinematographer